Pycnarmon abraxalis is a moth in the family Crambidae. It was described by Francis Walker in 1866. It is found in Darjeeling in India and in Bhutan.

References

Spilomelinae
Moths described in 1866
Moths of Asia